Young At Art Museum (YAA) is an interactive art museum in Plantation, Florida, founded in 1987. Founded by Esther and Mindy Shrago, Young At Art traveled South Florida for two years as a Museum Without Walls, opening in 1989 in a 3,200 sq. ft. storefront in Plantation, Florida. Young At Art relocated to Davie in 1998, moving into a 24,000 sq. ft. leased space. With federal, state, county, town and community support - and through a public/private partnership with Broward County - Young At Art opened a new 55,000 sq. ft. Gold LEED museum and public library on May 5, 2012, named by the Knight Foundation "as one of the most transformative arts initiatives in South Florida."
 In September 2020, Broward County ended Young at Art's lease due to the organization owing the county $803,932. In March 2021, the museum reopened at the Broward mall.

References

Children's museums in Florida
Museums established in 1987
Davie, Florida
1987 establishments in Florida
Museums in Broward County, Florida
Art museums and galleries in Florida